"Give It Up" is the first single from Twista's album Adrenaline Rush 2007. The song features Pharrell. The edited version of the song is called "Live It Up."

Music video
The music video premiered on AOL Music and on BET. It was directed by Hype Williams and references the video for Kanye West's "Gold Digger", which was also directed by Williams. The song also has a reference to the Red Hot Chili Peppers' song, "Give It Away".

Charts

2007 singles
2007 songs
Twista songs
Pharrell Williams songs
Music videos directed by Hype Williams
Song recordings produced by the Neptunes
Songs written by Twista
Atlantic Records singles
Songs written by Pharrell Williams